Hora de España (Spanish: Spain's Hour) was a Spanish language monthly literary magazine which was published by the Republicans during the civil war in Valencia, Spain. The subtitle of the magazine was Poesía y crítica (Poetry and criticism). It existed between January 1937 and October 1938.

History and profile
Hora de España was first published in January 1937. The founders were a group Spanish intellectuals led by Luis Cernuda and Juan Gil-Albert. The magazine was published on a monthly basis. It featured poetry, drama and essays on contemporary literature. Major contributors were the members of the Generation of '27, including Emilio Prados, Dámaso Alonso, León Felipe, Miguel Hernández, Antonio Machado, Rafael Alberti and Rosa Chacel. Hora de España was subject to criticisms over its passive political stance. The magazine ended publication in October 1938 shortly before the exile of its founders.

References

External links

1937 establishments in Spain
1938 disestablishments in Spain
Defunct literary magazines published in Europe
Defunct magazines published in Spain
Francoist Spain
Literary magazines published in Spain
Magazines established in 1937
Magazines disestablished in 1938
Mass media in Valencia
Monthly magazines published in Spain
Poetry literary magazines
Spanish-language magazines